Damon S. Johnson (born March 1, 1974) is an American former professional basketball player who played in the Icelandic Úrvalsdeild and the Spanish Liga ACB. He won the Icelandic national championship three times and was voted the Úrvalsdeild foreign player of the year twice. A naturalized Icelandic citizen, he played with the Iceland national basketball team in 2003.

Icelandic national team
Johnson played 5 games for the Iceland national basketball team during the 2003 Games of the Small States of Europe, where he averaged 17.3 points per game, helping Iceland finishing second.

Coaching career
Johnson was an assistant coach for King University from 2010 to 2012 and later for East Tennessee State women's basketball team. In 2019 he was hired as the head coach of Providence Academy í Johnson City.

Awards and honours

Iceland
2x Úrvalsdeild Foreign Player of the year (1999, 2002)
Úrvalsdeild Domestic All-First team (2003)
3x Icelandic champion (1997, 1999, 2003)
2x Icelandic Cup champion (1997, 2003)
3x Icelandic Company Cup champion (1996, 1998, 2002)

Spain
Spanish LEB All-Star Game (2000)

References

External links
Profile at KKI.is
Profile at fiba.com
Eurobasket.com Profile
Liga ACB stats at basketball-reference.com
College stats at sports-reference.com

1974 births
Living people
People from Johnson City, Tennessee
Damon Johnson
American men's basketball players
American emigrants to Iceland
American expatriate basketball people in Iceland
American expatriate basketball people in Spain
Basketball players from Tennessee
Hiwassee Tigers men's basketball players
Damon Johnson
ÍA men's basketball players
Damon Johnson
Tennessee Volunteers basketball players
Damon Johnson
Small forwards